Martina Navratilova and Pam Shriver defeated Gigi Fernández and Jana Novotná in the final, 4–6, 7–5, 6–4 to win the doubles tennis title at the 1991 Virginia Slims Championships. It was Navratilova's 13th and last Tour Finals doubles title, and Shriver's tenth and last.

Kathy Jordan and Elizabeth Smylie were the reigning champions, but Jordan did not qualify this year; Smylie partnered Nicole Provis, but was defeated in the quarterfinals by Fernández and Novotná.

Seeds

Draw

Draw

References
 Official Results Archive (ITF)
 Official Results Archive (WTA)

Doubles
1991 WTA Tour